Maningoza Special Reserve is a  wildlife reserve in Madagascar. It was created in 1956 to protect the many endemic plants and animals, and it also contains some of the last remaining areas of dry deciduous forest on the island.

Geography
The Maningoza Special Reserve was established in 1956 and is in the Melaky Region of Madagascar. The reserve is to the east of Antsalova and the nearest hotel accommodation is in Besalampy. It can be reached by boat on the Manambolo River although the reserve is only accessible to tourists during the dry season. The forest grows on iron-rich (or ferralitic) soil which forms due to the chemical weathering of most of the minerals; except for quartz. There is an  accumulation of secondary minerals and clays such as gibbiste, goethite and kaolinite, and an accumulation of humus. The people living in the villages around the reserve, are dependent for its resources and use the land for grazing zebu, and grow cassava, maize and rice.

Flora and fauna
The birds are poorly studied with fifty-two species recorded including twenty-five endemics. A number are of conservation concern, such as Schlegel's asity (Philepitta schlegeli) which is classified by the International Union for Conservation of Nature (IUCN) as near threatened due to habitat loss. Other resident birds include the giant coua (Coua gigas), Coquerel's coua (Coua coquereli), sickle-billed vanga (Falculea palliata) and the Sakalava weaver (Ploceus sakalava).

Of the fifteen species of mammal on the reserve, five are lemurs. Verreaux's sifaka (Propithecus verreauxi) is of most concern to the IUCN which is considered to be endangered, and the common brown lemur (Eulemur fulvus) which is near threatened. The other lemurs are, the eastern lesser bamboo lemur (Hapalemur griseus), gray mouse lemur (Microcebus murinus) and the fat-tailed dwarf lemur (Cheirogaleus medius).

It is crossed by the Manambolo River.

See also
 List of national parks of Madagascar

References

External links
 Madagascar National Parks

Melaky
1956 establishments in Madagascar
Special reserves of Madagascar
Protected areas established in 1956
Madagascar dry deciduous forests
Important Bird Areas of Madagascar